Fukuyama (written: 福山) is a Japanese surname. Notable people with the surname include:

Francis Fukuyama, Japanese-American philosopher and political economist
Jun Fukuyama, Japanese voice actor
Masaharu Fukuyama, Japanese singer-songwriter
, Japanese volleyball player
Tohru Fukuyama, Japanese chemist
Yoshiki Fukuyama, Japanese guitarist

Japanese-language surnames